Bento, a diminutive of Benedito is a Portuguese name meaning Benedict based on Late Latin Benedictus, "blessed", "well spoken of". It can be used as a given name or a surname.

It may refer to:

Given name
Bento António Gonçalves, member of the Portuguese Communist Party
Bento or Benedito de Espinosa, aka Baruch de Spinoza, a Dutch philosopher
Bento Gonçalves da Silva, Brazilian revolutionary, leader of the Ragamuffin War
Bento de Góis, Portuguese Jesuit
Bento Teixeira, Portuguese-Brazilian poet
  Bento Carneiro, a Chico Anysio character
António Bento Bembe, Cabinda/Angolan politician

Surname
Manuel Bento, Portuguese footballer
Paulo Bento, Portuguese footballer
Rui Bento, Portuguese footballer

See also
Bento (disambiguation)
São Bento

Portuguese-language surnames
Portuguese masculine given names